Charles Stephen Faulkner (21 October 19224 December 2000), professionally Chuck Faulkner was a Northern Irish-born Australian actor and US radio talk show host, he was best known for his role as Det. Snr. Sgt. Keith Vickers in the Australian television police drama Division 4, appearing in 300 episodes from 1969-1975.

Born in Belfast, Northern Ireland, after relocating to Australia he was one of Australian television's first news presenters at the Nine Network with studio TCN from 1956-1964. Faulkner moved to the United States in the late 1970s and became a talk show host on radio station WNIS in Norfolk, Virginia until the mid 1980s.

References

External links

Male television actors from Northern Ireland
Male actors from Belfast
1922 births
2000 deaths
20th-century male actors from Northern Ireland
Northern Ireland emigrants to Australia